Adv. or ADV may refer to:

 Adventure
 Adventure type of visual novel
 Adverb
 Adverbial case
 Adversary in law; see Adversarial system
 Advertising
 Advocate 
 A.D. Vision, a defunct multimedia entertainment company based in Houston, Texas, and its subsidiaries:
 ADV Films, a former publisher of anime and tokusatsu videos
 ADV Manga, a former publisher of manga
 ADV Music
 Acoustic Doppler velocimetry, in flow measurement
 Acoustic droplet vaporization
 Aleutian disease Virus, a disease of ferrets and minks, or the virus that causes it
 Andover Airfield, Hampshire, UK (IATA airport code)
 Andover railway station (England), UK (National Rail code)
 Australian Defence Vessel, a non-commissioned vessel in the Royal Australian Navy